Walter Gustave Haenschen ( - March 27, 1980) was an arranger and composer of music and an orchestra conductor, primarily on old-time radio programs.

Early years
Haenschen was born in St. Louis to parents who had come from Germany and settled in that city. His father was Walter Haenschen, an invalid, and his mother was Frieda Haenschen. All of his family played music or sang, including an aunt who was a concert pianist. His uncle taught music in Europe and in Chicago. Haenschen attended McKinley High School. While he was in elementary school, he carried newspapers to earn money, and as a high-school student he and some friends formed the Eclipse Novelty Company to make pennants to sell at football games. As a teenager, he played piano to accompany silent films in St. Louis theaters.

Haenschen's involvement in music progressed in 1913, when he was an undergraduate student in mechanical engineering at Washington University in St. Louis. He was asked to help with the university's annual Quadrangle Club musical show, and his involvement grew from helping to a promise "to shoulder the entire musical responsibility for the production". Haenschen asked musicians in St. Louis for advice about conducting and arranging music, and their tips helped him to produce the program and to form a career in music. He also expanded his musical talents by learning to play the cello, cornet, and double bass.

While he continued in his engineering studies, Haenschen began to focus more on music, organizing a band and producing another musical program. That second program included his new composition, "Moorish Tango", which became popular with dancers in the St. Louis area. Some dancers from out of town heard the song when they were visiting, and later Haenschen received a telegram asking for permission to use the song in a Broadway show. That initial use of the song on Broadway caused Haenschen to go to New York City, where his dealing with Max Dreyfus resulted in publication of the song as "Moorish Glide".  After that, Florenz Ziegfeld Jr. re-titled the song "Underneath the Japanese Moon" and used it in his Ziegfeld Follies.

Career

Early career
Haenshcen graduated from Washington University's School of Engineering & Applied Sciences in 1914 as an engineer, but he pursued a career in music. He led and managed a ragtime orchestra that was popular and made him "locally famous" in St. Louis. The group's engagements included two years of playing for open-air dances in St. Louis's city parks. Brewery owner August Anheuser Busch Sr. helped Haenschen to get additional musical work at social events, including country-club dances, and Haenschen's band sometimes played between innings at home games of the Busch-owned St. Louis Cardinals baseball team. He formed a service that booked orchestras for performances in St. Louis and in several states. Haenschen also became manager of the Vandervoort Music Salon's "talking machine department", a position that he left when he enlisted in the Navy, where he served as an ensign until his June 1918 discharge. In 1919, Haenschen joined Brunswick Records as manager of the company's popular-records department.

Radio and television 
In 1923, Haenschen began his career as a conductor of radio orchestras, starting at WJZ in New York City. He was the orchestra director for Songs Our Mothers Used to Sing, a 13-week series of electrically transcribed radio programs broadcast on WLWL in New York City in 1931-32. In the mid-1940s, he directed the orchestra at WJR in Detroit. He also conducted orchestras for network radio programs, including  The Palmolive Hour, Bayer Musical Review; Coca-Cola Song Shop; Lavender and Old Lace; Maxwell House Show Boat; The Album of American Music; and Saturday Night Serenade. In 1950, Haenschen signed with Harry Bluestone to record The Broadway Parade, a series of transcribed programs. His other transcribed radio programs included Chevrolet Musical Moments Revue.

In the late 1940s, Haenschen and two partners formed HRH Television Features Corporation to produce English versions of grand opera for television. By April 1949 they had 57 operas ready for production. Each opera was condensed in a way that maintained continuity, eliminating "the unimportant and often tiresome parts of the score, retaining only the important parts."

Other conducting 
While he worked for Brunswick Records, Haenschen conducted the company's house orchestra on recordings. Because of anti-German feelings at that time, immediately after World War I, he used the name Carl Fenton Orchestra on record labels. In the mid-1940s, Gus Haenschen's All-String Orchestra was an ensemble affiliated with the Detroit Symphony Orchestra.

Composing and arranging
Songs composed by Haenschen included "Easy Melody", "Silver Star", "Lullaby of Love", "Manhattan Merry-Go-Round", and "Rosita". He sometimes used the pseudonym Paul Crane for compositions, including "Down on the Farm", "President Harding March", "President Coolidge March", "The St. Louis Society Dance", and (with A. Bernard) "Keep on Going, When You Get Where You're Going You Won't Be Missed at All".Haenschen composed some of the music for the Broadway production Grand Street Follies (1926), and he was the arranger for the musical No Foolin''' (1926). He and Arthur W. Profix composed the musical The Hawaiian Follies'' (1918).

Later career 
After Haenschen stopped conducting, he worked with G. H. Johnston on broadcasts of the Metropolitan Opera and the New York Philharmonic.

Personal life and death
Haenschen was married to Roxanne Hussy, and they had two daughters and a son. He received an honorary doctor of music degree from Ithaca College in 1945. He died on March 27, 1980, in Stamford Hospital, aged 90.

References 

1980 deaths
20th-century American composers
20th-century American musicians
American radio bandleaders
Musicians from St. Louis
Washington University in St. Louis alumni
McKelvey School of Engineering alumni